The 1170s was a decade of the Julian Calendar which began on January 1, 1170, and ended on December 31, 1179.

Significant people
 Saladin also known as Salah ad-Din Yusuf ibn Ayyub
 Al-Mustadi caliph of Baghdad
 Pope Alexander III

References